RW MacKenna (1874-1930) was a Scottish physician and author. He is best known for his historical novels set in the time of the Covenanters.

Biography 
RW MacKenna was born in Dumfries. He studied at Dumfries Academy where he was taught by John Neilson, who had also taught J. M. Barrie. He began studying at the University of Edinburgh in 1892 where he was the first person to simultaneously complete arts and medical courses.

Bibliography

References 

 
1874 births
1930 deaths
20th-century Scottish novelists
People educated at Dumfries Academy
Alumni of the University of Edinburgh
20th-century Scottish medical doctors